Lucas Javier Godoy (born 25 March 1982) is an Argentine lawyer and politician, currently serving as National Deputy elected in Salta Province. A member of the Justicialist Party, Godoy was elected in 2019, and currently sits in the Frente de Todos bloc. He was a member of the Salta Province Chamber of Deputies from 2011 to 2019.

Early life and education
Godoy was born on 25 March 1982 in Salta. His father is Manuel Santiago Godoy, a Justicialist Party politician who was president of the Salta Province Chamber of Deputies. He has three siblings, is married, and has two children.

Godoy studied law at the National University of Tucumán, graduating in 2006, and counts with a degree on parliamentary law and legislation from Universidad San Pablo-T.

Political career
In the 2011 provincial elections, Godoy was the second candidate in the Justicialist Party list to the Provincial Chamber of Deputies, behind Guido Giacosa. The list came second in the general election, and Godoy was elected. He was re-elected in 2015, winning the P.A.S.O. primaries with 22,237 votes, and coming third in the general electio behind the Romero+Olmedo Front and Republican Proposal. As provincial deputy, Godoy presided the Human Rights parliamentary commission, and during his two terms, he was the legislator who introduced the most bills to the Chamber.

Ahead of the 2019 general election, Godoy and Noelia Bonetto competed in the Frente de Todos primaries to the Argentine Chamber of Deputies against the list of Jorge Guaymás and Verónica Caliva. Godoy's list won the primaries, and in the end, the Frente de Todos list was composed of Godoy and Caliva. The list received 46.08% of the popular vote and both Godoy and Caliva were elected. He was sworn in on 4 December 2019.

As a national deputy, Godoy formed part of the parliamentary commissions on Commerce, Consumer Rights, Modernization of Parliamentary Procedure, Industry, Justice, General Legislation, Public Works, and Small and Medium-sized Enterprises. Despite his personal opposition to the practice, Godoy was a supporter of the legalization of abortion in Argentina, voting in favour of the 2020 Voluntary Interruption of Pregnancy bill that passed the Argentine Congress.

References

External links
Profile on the official website of the Chamber of Deputies (in Spanish)

Living people
1982 births
21st-century Argentine lawyers
People from Salta
Members of the Argentine Chamber of Deputies elected in Salta
Justicialist Party politicians
National University of Tucumán alumni
21st-century Argentine politicians